John Buckner, LL.D. (1734–1824) was an Anglican clergyman who served in the Church of England as the Bishop of Chichester from 1797 to 1824.

Family
Baptised at Boxgrove on 12 June 1734, he  was the elder son of Richard Buckner (died 1777), steward to Charles Lennox, 2nd Duke of Richmond, and his wife Mary Saunders (died 1772). His younger brother Charles Buckner became an Admiral in the Royal Navy. On 6 December 1768 at Portsmouth, Hampshire, he married Elizabeth Heron (born 1739), daughter of John Vining Heron and his wife Frances Leake, whose brothers in law were Rear-Admiral Charles Webber (1722-1783) and William Smith (1721-1803). The two did not have any children, she dying in July 1789  and he on 1 May 1824.

Education
John went to Charterhouse School (nominated by the Duke of Richmond for a foundation scholarship when 12 years old and had a free education).  On leaving he received an exhibition to go to university.  From 1751-55 he studied at Clare College, Cambridge.  BA 1755.  He became a Deacon in 1756 and a priest in 1758.  MA 1765.  LLD (Lambeth) 1787.

Career

Bishop Buckner's 1824 obituary in the London Magazine noted that he and his brother Charles had "owed their advancement in life" to a close relationship with the Dukes of Richmond. Indeed, it was speculated in a 2011 article that their father Richard might have been an illegitimate son of the first Duke, Charles Lennox, himself an illegitimate son of King Charles II. Traditional sources though hold that Richard Buckner was an immigrant from Westphalia.

Tutor to the Duke of Richmond.  1762 Domestic Chaplain to the third Duke of Richmond and present at the taking of Havana.  1761-1772 Vicar of Lyminster, Sussex.  1764-1766 Rector of West Stoke, Sussex.  1766-1774 Rector of Southwick.  1768 Prebendary of Chichester and Vicar of Westhampnett.  1771-1788 Vicar of Eartham.  1772-1788 Vicar of Boxgrove. 1785 Resident Canon of Chichester.  1788-1824 Rector of St Giles in the Fields, London and Rector of Newdigate, Surrey.  Prebendary of Eartham.  1792 Archdeacon of Chichester.  1797-1824 Bishop of Chichester and was still active until he died.  He had a house in Wigmore Street in London.  Granted Arms jointly with his brother in 1804.  The family vault is in the south transept of the cathedral, however this is believed to have been damaged and/or obscured when the cathedral tower fell down early in the 19th century.  There are portraits of the bishop at Goodwood (by George Romney), in the Rector's Vestry of St Giles in the Fields and in the Bishop's Palace, Chichester.

It is recorded that Bishop Buckner, with the aid of a very considerable sum of money from his predecessor's estate, "applied a liberal addition of his own monies to render the house (palace) fit for episcopal residence; and his improvements were certainly dictated by judgement and taste."

He was nominated Bishop of the Diocese of Chichester by King George III on 2 October, received Congé d'élire and letter missive on 11 October, elected on 27 October, and Royal assent on 10 November 1797. He was consecrated on 4 March and enthroned at Chichester Cathedral on 28 March 1798. He died in office on 1 May 1824.

References

1734 births
1824 deaths
People educated at Charterhouse School
Bishops of Chichester
People from Lyminster
People from Boxgrove